Balmain Sailing Club is a sailing club in Municipality of Leichhardt in the Inner West of Sydney, in the state of New South Wales, Australia.

The club currently has approximately 300 members and races a keelboat fleet and a dinghy fleet. The club runs a full racing calendar throughout the year, with Summer, Winter and Spring series, along with Summer Twilights (pre- and post-Christmas) and a number of non point-score races. Keelboat fleet races are organised across 4 divisions, with entrants from clubs across the western harbour area on Sundays, and as another 4 divisions in the Friday Twilight Series during summer. The dinghy fleet races in two divisions.

Location

The club is located in Water Street on the northern side of the Balmain Peninsular in the suburb of Birchgrove, with water-front access directly into Sydney Harbour

History

The club was originally formed in 1885. After a long period of little activity, the club was re-formed in 1995.

Balmain Regatta

The club hosts the annual Balmain Regatta, which is claimed to be the oldest in Australia, on the last Sunday in October each year. The event was first held in 1849 and ran continuously until the outbreak of World War I. With the revival of the club in the 1990s, the regatta restarted in 1996 and has run annually ever since.

The event includes classic 18- and 10-foot skiff, dinghy and yacht races and is a celebration of the local community connection with Sydney Harbour and the local boat-building industry.

Board of Directors
As of 2020–2021:
 Commodore: Campbell Reid
 Vice-Commodore / Race Director: Alan Gregory
 Secretary: Colin Grove
 Treasurer: Ed Tacey
 Director: Conrad Johnston
 Director: Ray Miller
 Director: Chantelle Hodgson
 Director: Mike West

References

 Solling, M; Reynolds, P; Leichhardt: On the margins of the city, Allen & Unwin, 1997, .
 Balmain Sailing Club website , Accessed August 2006.

External links

 Balmain Sailing Club
 Local Images at InnerWest ImageBank
 Local History Collection, Leichhardt Council

Yacht clubs in New South Wales
1885 establishments in Australia
Sports clubs established in 1885
Sporting clubs in Sydney
Annual sporting events
Balmain, New South Wales